Miki (written:  lit. "three trees") is a Japanese surname. Notable people with the surname include:

Honoka Miki (born 1997), Japanese actress
Minoru Miki (1930–2011), Japanese composer and artistic director
Mutsuko Miki (1917-2012), Japanese activist who advocated on behalf of pacifism, official compensation for comfort women, and improved Japan–North Korea relations, wife of Japanese Prime Minister Takeo Miki
Shinichiro Miki (born 1968), Japanese voice actor
, Japanese rower
Tsubaki Miki (born 2003), Japanese snowboarder
Takeo Miki (1907–1988), 66th Prime Minister of Japan
Taku Miki (born 1935), writer
, Japanese hurdler

Fictional characters
Sayaka Miki, a character in the anime series Puella Magi Madoka Magica

Japanese-language surnames